Gerard Pieter Adolfs (born 2 January 1897 in Semarang, Central-Java; died 1 February 1968 in 's-Hertogenbosch, the Netherlands) was a Dutch East Indies painter and architect. In the 1930s – at the height of his artistic career – the press called G.P. Adolfs the "Wizard of Light".

Biography 

Adolfs spent his youth in Java and received at home his first artistic inspirations. His father, Gerardus Cornelis Adolfs, was an architect and a versatile amateur (painter, photographer, piano and violin player as well as a pole vaulter). Adolfs studied architecture in Amsterdam. After graduating, he was drawn back to Java, where he designed houses in Yogyakarta, Surakarta and Surabaya. But soon he swapped the drawing pen for the dry-point, pencil and brush and from then on dedicated his whole life to painting.

He was already well known as a talented advertising illustrator, when in 1924 he was first introduced to the public of Yogyakarta as a painter, water-colourist and graphic artist. Each year Adolfs travelled for a few months. He had studios in Florence, Rome, Vienna, Budapest, Prague and - together with his Japanese friend Léonard Tsuguharu Fujita - in Paris and exhibited his works of art internationally (Netherlands Indies, Japan, Singapore, United States, England, Netherlands, Sweden, Norway, France, Switzerland…).

The main subjects of his work were scenes of Java, Bali, Japan and of North Africa (market sceneries, cock-fights, landscapes and townscapes). In 1940 – shortly before the occupation of the Netherlands – Adolfs came back to Europe and settled in Amsterdam. On 22 February 1944, during an exhibition at the Kunstzaal Pollmann, the largest part of Adolfs' paintings was destroyed by the bombardment of Nijmegen. Adolfs kept on working. He wrote and illustrated a book about his memories of Surabaya and exhibited in many well-known galleries. He lived mostly in Amsterdam - interrupted by longer stays in Scandinavia, France, Spain, Italy and North Africa.
In 1967 he retired to a small village in South-Holland. On 1 February 1968, G.P. Adolfs died in 's-Hertogenbosch, North Brabant.

Critics

Bibliography 

 Adolfs, G.P.: SOERABAIA. Jacob van Campen, Amsterdam, 1946/1947.
 Allgemeines Künstlerlexikon. Hrsg. Meissner, Günther, VEB E.A. Seemann Verlag, Leipzig, 1983
 Borntraeger-Stoll, Eveline & Orsini, Gianni: Gerard Pieter Adolfs - The Painter of Java and Bali. Pictures Publishers, The Netherlands, 2008, .
 Dermawan, A. T.: A collector's journey - Modern painting in Indonesia: Collection of Jusuf Wanandi. Centre for Strategic and International Studies, Jakarta and Neka Museum, Ubud, 1996.
 Habnit, F.F.: Krèta Sètan, de duivelswagen. Autopioniers van Insulinde. Tong Tong, Den Haag, 1977.
 Haks, L., Maris, G.: Lexicon of foreign artists who visualized Indonesia 1600 -1950. Gert Jan Bestebreurtje, Utrecht, 1995.
 Hart, George H.C.: Het sprookje van de kleine prinses, het arme waschmeisje en de vlinder. Melbourne, 1943. First published in Surabaya, 1928.
 Holt, C.: Art in Indonesia, Continuities and Change. Cornell University Press, Ithaca New York, 1967.
 Java-China-Japan-Line: Bali and Java. De Unie, 1938.
 Lee Man Fong: Paintings and Statues from the President Sukarno of the Republic of Indonesia, II. Publishing Committee of Collection of paintings and statues of President Sukarno, Jakarta, 1964.
 Scheen, Pieter A.: Lexicon: Nederlandse beeldende kunstenaars 1880 - 1980. Pieter A. Scheen B.V., The Hague, 1981.
 Spanjaard, H.: Exploring Modern Indonesian Art: The Collection of Dr Oei Hong Djien .SNP Editions, Singapore, 2004.
 Spruit, R.: Indonesische Impressies. Oosterse thema's in de westerse schilderkunst. Pictures Publishers, Wijk en Aalburg, 1992.
 Studio, the, A Magazine of Fine and Applied Art. Vol. 94 No 412, July 1927, 62 - 63.
 Studio, the, A Magazine of Fine and Applied Art. Vol. 140 No 691, October 1950, 116 - 117.

External links 

 http://www.gerardpieteradolfs.com
 G.P. Adolfs on artprice.com
 

Dutch architects
People from Semarang
1897 births
1968 deaths
20th-century Dutch painters
Dutch male painters
20th-century Dutch male artists